Guyhirn (sometimes spelled Guyhirne) is a village near the town of Wisbech in Cambridgeshire, England. It is on the northern bank of the River Nene, at the junction of the A141 with the A47. The population is included in the civil parish of Wisbech St Mary. It is notable chiefly for the Chapel of Ease, a rare example of church architecture  of the Interregnum (1649–1660), and as a key crossing point of the River Nene.

History
According to A Dictionary of British Place Names, Guyhirn, which was 'La Gyerne' in 1275,  derives from the Old French 'guie', which means "a guide" (referencing the control of tidal flow or a "salt-water ditch"), with the Old English 'hyrne', which means an "angle or corner of land".

According to folklore, recorded in the early nineteenth century, Guyhirn was the site of "a severe engagement between a Saxon King and the abbot of Ely... the legend informs us that 5000 men were brought into the field... it arose from disputes respecting the boundaries of property." 

The village is on the opposite bank of the River Nene to Ring's End where John Morton, Bishop of Ely, erected a tower house to oversee his new drain, Morton's Leam, one of the oldest fenland drains, in the late fifteenth century.

In the seventeenth and eighteenth century Calvinist Huguenot families, including the Culys, Snushells and the Tegerdines, settled in Guyhirn to drain outlying levels. They most probably came from the Huguenot settlement at Thorney. Some of these families went on to farm the reclaimed land.  It has been speculated that the Guyhirn Chapel of Ease was built as a result of their influence or that its simplicity was a factor in their resettlement.

River crossing 
A river ferry crossing between Guyhirn and Ring's End is mentioned in numerous newspaper reports of accidents and drownings. Until its demolition in 1990, for the widening of the A141 for the building of the new road bridge, the Ferry Boat Inn stood on the river's northern bank.   

Guyhirne railway station on the Great Northern and Great Eastern Joint Railway was opened in 1867. The railway required the building of the first bridge across both Morton's Leam and the River Nene. The railway bridge incorporated a foot bridge, which allowed free passage between Guyhirn and Ring's End for pedestrians. This greatly reduced demand for the ferry.

The first road bridge across the Nene at Guyhirn was officially opened by Sir W. H. Clarke, Chairman of the Isle of Ely County Council, on 22 April 1925. It was the result of a decades long campaign led by local county councillors William Weston and Richard Payne. The bridge's total span was 180 feet, it was built by Messrs Baldry, Yerburgh & Hutchinson and made of reinforced concrete with wrought iron railings each side of the roadway, which was 20 feet wide. This bridge was officially closed on 5 October 1990. The current road bridge carrying the A47 across the river, was officially opened on 10 October 1990 by Malcolm Moss, MP for North East Cambridgeshire. It was built by Beazer Construction East Anglia, of Wisbech, at a cost of £3.65m.
The upgraded roundabout was opened in 2022 and the bridge named Tiddy Mun Bridge by 13 year-old schoolgirl Ava MCulloch.

Religion

The first chapel in Guyhirn originated in a chantry founded in 1337 by John de Reddik. It was dedicated to St Mary Magdalen and was licensed for public worship in 1398. In 1406 the chaplain was Sir John Grey. A guild to St Mary Magdalen was active in Guyhirn in the sixteenth century and such guilds were often established to pay for a chaplaincy. One year after the dissolution of the chantries in 1548, the chapel's endowments and property were sold to William Ward. The dismissed chaplain, William Susan, received an annual pension of three pounds and ten shillings per annum. In 1877 "quantities of fine chiselled stone" were unearthed during the construction of the extant church, suggesting that this stands on or close to the location of the earlier chapel. 

The village was without a place of worship for over a century until Guyhirn Chapel of Ease was commissioned during the Commonwealth. However, it was not completed until 1660 when the Restoration had returned Anglicanism as the official religious observance. It is recorded in the National Heritage List for England as a designated Grade II* listed building, and is in the care of the Churches Conservation Trust. 

Between the seventeenth and early nineteenth centuries, Guyhirn was home to a sect of religious dissenters known as the Culymites. They were named after their founder, David Culy, the son of a Huguenot family that had moved to Guyhirn. Culy, who founded his sect in 1695, became known as the 'Bishop of Guyhirn'. His theology was said to differ little from that of the Anabaptists. It was recorded that "most of the inhabitants of [Guyhirn] became his followers, and many also from Whittlesea, Wisbech St. Mary's, Outwell and Upwell". It has been estimated that his followers came to number more than 700.   

A Methodist Chapel was built in 1849 and rebuilt in 1868 by the Primitive Methodists with pews for 147 worshipers. It was sited next to the current village hall, but has been demolished.  

Formerly within the parish of Wisbech St Mary, Guyhirn (with Rings End) was made a parish in its own right in 1870. The parish church of St Mary Magdalene was built in 1878. It was designed by architect George Gilbert Scott  for his older brother, Canon John Scott of Wisbech. Since 31 October 1983 it has been designated a Grade II listed building. It was constructed of gault brick with stone dressings, with a timber porch and western bell cote. Now redundant, it was put up for sale in 2018 for £75,000.
.

Education 
Supported by the National Society, Guyhirn School opened in 1875.  It remains a "a small, family centered Church of England Primary School that is committed to promoting our Christian values."

Notable residents 

 Margaret George (1899–1983), social documentary photographer. Margaret was the daughter of the Rev. Maurice. D. George, who became vicar of Guyhirn & Ring's End in 1918. She was given her first camera at twelve years of age. She photographed the daily life of the village from workers in the fields to mothers holding their newborns. She exhaustively dated and annotated her photographs, even naming animals. These were, in turn, archived in albums. Her collection is now held by the Wisbech & Fenland Museum.

See also
Guyhirne railway station
Guyhirn Chapel of Ease

References

External links

Villages in Cambridgeshire
Fenland District
Guyhirn